William II (February 1227 – 28 January 1256) was the Count of Holland and Zeeland from 1234 until his death. He was elected anti-king of Germany in 1248 and ruled as sole king from 1254 onwards.

Early life
William was the eldest son and heir of Count Floris IV of Holland and Matilda of Brabant. When his father was killed at a tournament at Corbie, William was only seven years old. His paternal uncles William and Otto, bishop of Utrecht, were his guardians until 1239.

Kingship
With the help of his maternal uncle Duke Henry II of Brabant and the Cologne archbishop Konrad von Hochstaden, William was elected king of Germany after Emperor Frederick II was excommunicated by Pope Innocent IV. He succeeded Landgrave Henry Raspe of Thuringia who had died within a year after his election as anti-king in 1246.

The next year, William decided to extend his father's hunting residence to a palace which met his new status. This would later be called the Binnenhof (Inner Court) and was the beginning of the city of The Hague. Meanwhile, after a siege of five months, William besieged Aachen for six months before capturing it from Frederick's followers. Only then could he be crowned as king by Archbishop Konrad of Cologne. He gained a certain amount of theoretical support from some of the German princes after his marriage to Elizabeth, daughter of the Welf duke Otto of Brunswick-Lüneburg, on 25 January 1252. He was elected as King of the Romans a second time on 25 March 1252 at Brunswick. The electors were the Archbishops of Cologne, Mainz and Trier, the Margrave of Brandenburg and the Duke of Saxony. The Count Palatine, who was also Duke of Bavaria, was excluded from taking part in the election on the ground that, as a supporter of Conrad IV, he was under sentence of excommunication. After the election, the King of Bohemia sent ambassadors conveying his consent to it.  However, although "William lacked neither courage nor chivalrous qualities... his power never extended beyond the Rhineland."

In his home county, William fought with Countess Margaret II of Flanders for control of Zeeland. As king of Germany, he made himself count of Zeeland. In July 1253, he defeated the Flemish army at Westkapelle (in modern-day Belgium) and a year later a cease-fire followed.  His anti-Flemish policy worsened his relationship with France. From 1254 to his death he fought a number of wars against the West Frisians. He built some strong castles in Heemskerk and Haarlem and created roads for the war against the Frisians.

William gave city rights to Haarlem, Delft, 's-Gravenzande and Alkmaar. According to the Annales Wormatienses, on 10 November 1255 William "eliminated the rights of citizens who are called Pfahlbürger so that among other restrictions, none of the cities were permitted to have them or receive them"; a later scribe added a gloss to clarify that the Pfahlburgers "were citizens who were not resident in the city".

Marriage and issue
William married Elisabeth of Brunswick-Lüneburg, daughter of Otto the Child, Duke of Brunswick-Lüneburg, in 1252. They had a son, Floris V (1254 – 1296).

Death 
In battle near Hoogwoud on 28 January 1256, William tried to traverse a frozen lake by himself, because he was lost, but his horse fell through the ice. In this vulnerable position, William was killed by the Frisians, who secretly buried him under the floor of a house.  His body was recovered 26 years later by his son Floris V, who took terrible vengeance on the West-Frisians. William was then buried in Middelburg. Contemporary sources, including the chronicle of Melis Stoke, portray William as an Arthurian hero. A golden statue of William can be found on the Binnenhof in The Hague, the inner court of the parliamentary complex of the Netherlands.

See also
 Counts of Holland family tree

References

External links
 

|-

William II, Count of Holland
William II, Count of Holland
13th-century Kings of the Romans
Dutch monarchs
Counts of Holland
Military personnel killed in action
Medieval child monarchs
Anti-kings